2195 Tengström, provisional designation , is a stony Florian asteroid from the inner regions of the asteroid belt, approximately 8 kilometers in diameter. It was discovered on 27 September 1941, by Finnish astronomer Liisi Oterma at Turku Observatory in Southwest Finland, and named for Swedish geodesist Erik Tengström.

Orbit and classification 

Tengström is a member of the Flora family of stony asteroids, one of the largest families of the main belt. It orbits the Sun in the inner main-belt at a distance of 2.0–2.5 AU once every 3 years and 4 months (1,210 days). Its orbit has an eccentricity of 0.11 and an inclination of 5° with respect to the ecliptic.

Physical characteristics 

Tengström has been characterized as a metallic M-type and stony S-type asteroid.

Rotation period 

Between 2006 and 2016, several well defined rotational lightcurves of Tengström were obtained by astronomers David Higgins, Petr Pravec, Pierre Antonini and René Roy. Lightcurve analysis gave a rotation period of 2.821 hours with a brightness variation between 0.17 and 0.45 magnitude. For an asteroid of its size, Tengström has a relatively fast spin rate, not far from the 2.2-hour threshold for fast rotators.

Diameter and albedo 

According to the survey carried out by NASA's Wide-field Infrared Survey Explorer with its subsequent NEOWISE mission, Tengström measures between 7.14 and 8.73 kilometers in diameter and its surface has a high albedo of 0.34 to 0.45. NEOWISE also classifies it as a metallic asteroid, despite its much higher albedo. The Collaborative Asteroid Lightcurve Link assumes an albedo of 0.24 – derived from 8 Flora, the family's largest member and namesake – and calculates a diameter of 8.98 kilometers using an absolute magnitude of 12.4.

Naming 

This minor planet was named after Swedish geodesist and astronomer Erik Tengström (1913–1996), emeritus professor at Uppsala University on the celebration of his 70th anniversary. The official naming citation was published by the Minor Planet Center on 28 March 1983.

Notes

References

External links 
 Asteroid Lightcurve Database (LCDB), query form (info )
 Dictionary of Minor Planet Names, Google books
 Asteroids and comets rotation curves, CdR – Observatoire de Genève, Raoul Behrend
 Discovery Circumstances: Numbered Minor Planets (1)-(5000) – Minor Planet Center
 
 

002195
Discoveries by Liisi Oterma
Named minor planets
19410927